King of Beggars is a 1992 Hong Kong martial arts comedy film directed by Gordon Chan, starring Stephen Chow, Sharla Cheung, Ng Man-tat and Norman Chui. The story is loosely based on legends about the martial artist So Chan (better known as "Beggar So"), who lived in the late Qing dynasty and was one of the Ten Tigers of Canton.

Plot
So Chan is the spoiled son of a wealthy general in Canton. Although he is lazy and illiterate, he excels in martial arts. While visiting a brothel, So falls in love with Yu-shang, a prostitute who dares to behave rudely towards him. So vies for Yu-shang's services with Chiu Mo-kei, a high-ranking government official, by trying to outbid him. By outbidding Chiu, So inadvertently foils an attempt by Yu-Shang, who was actually in undercover, to assassinate Chiu. Yu-shang wanted to get close to Chiu in order to avenge her father, who had been murdered by Chiu. Yu-shang agrees to marry So if he can win the title of "Martial Arts Champion".

To win Yu-shang's hand-in-marriage, So enters the imperial martial arts contest to win the championship title. So's father helps him cheat his way through the written examination, while his personal expertise in martial arts carries him through the physical tests. So eventually emerges as champion, but just as the emperor is about to grant him the title, Chiu reveals that So is illiterate, proving that he cheated in the written examination. The enraged emperor orders So's family properties and possessions to be confiscated, and decrees that they shall remain as beggars for the rest of their lives.

So does not adapt well to his new life. He encounters Chiu on the streets and Chiu breaks his legs, preventing him from practising martial arts again. So is introduced by his father to join the Beggars' Gang, but he is ashamed when he finds out that Yu-shang's family leads the gang. He spends most of his time sleeping in seclusion. By coincidence, he meets an elderly beggar, whom he helped earlier, and the beggar attempts to cheer him up by healing his wounds and teaching him the Sleeping Arhat Skill. When Yu-shang is kidnapped by Chiu later, So is shaken out of his delusional state as he wants to save her. He tricks the Beggars' Gang into electing him as their new chief by pretending that he is possessed by the spirit of Hung Tsat-kung, a legendary former chief of the gang. Using his improved literacy, he reads the gang's ancient martial arts manual and learns seventeen of the Eighteen Subduing Dragon Palms. The last move, however, is not shown in the book.

Meanwhile, Chiu puts Yu-shang into a magical trance and attempts to use her as a puppet to assassinate the emperor. So leads his beggars across the Great Wall to stop Chiu and they engage Chiu in battle. So manages to save Yu-shang in the nick of time. He uses all the skills he has learnt to fight Chiu, but they prove insufficient to completely defeat Chiu. When Chiu conjures a windstorm, So's manual falls out and forms a flip book which animates the first seventeen of the Eighteen Subduing Dragon Palms. So suddenly realises that the final move is a combination of the earlier seventeen and he uses it to destroy Chiu and save the emperor.

In the final scenes, Yu-shang agrees to marry So, and the grateful emperor asks So what reward he desires. So chooses to remain as the king of beggars and the emperor expresses worries about So wielding much influence over the masses. However, So reminds him that as long as the people are cared for, there will not be enough beggars to pose a threat to the emperor.

So and Yu-shang are seen wandering the streets with their large family, using an imperial tablet given to them by the emperor to force rich people to give them money.

Cast
 Stephen Chow as So Chan / "Beggar So"
 Sharla Cheung as Yu-shang / Ru-shuang
 Ng Man-tat as General So
 Vindy Chan as Tracy
 Norman Chui as Chiu Mo-kei
 Lam Wai as Sengge Rinchen
 Wong Chung as Uncle Mok
 Natalis Chan as Secretary of Justice
 Lawrence Cheng as Professor
 Matthew Wong as Emperor
 Peter Lai as Uncle Cheng
 Jackson Ng as Botaroto
 Yang Mi as So Chan's daughter
 Chow Yee-fan
 Lee Kin-yan
 Kingdom Yuen
 Yuen Cheung-yan

Music
The film's theme song, Cheung-lo Man-man Bun-nei Chong (長路漫漫伴你闖; The Long Road Accompanies You On Your Adventure), was sung by George Lam in Cantonese.

Award nominations

References

External links
 
 

1990s Cantonese-language films
1992 films
1992 action comedy films
Kung fu films
Hong Kong martial arts comedy films
Films directed by Gordon Chan
Hong Kong action comedy films
Films set in the Qing dynasty
1990s Hong Kong films